The Pontifical Catholic University of Chile (PUC or UC Chile) is one of the six Catholic Universities existing in the Chilean university system and one of the two pontifical universities in the country, along with the Pontifical Catholic University of Valparaíso. Founded in 1888, it is also one of Chile's oldest universities and one of the most recognized educational institutions in Latin America.

Pontifical Catholic University of Chile has a strong and long-standing rivalry with Universidad de Chile, as they are both widely recognized as the most traditional and prestigious in the country, and one is Catholic and the other, secular. This rivalry also translates to sports, especially football.

Campuses
UC Chile has four campuses in Santiago and one campus in Villarrica. The campuses in Santiago are:
 Casa Central (in downtown Santiago)
 San Joaquín (in Macul Commune of Greater Santiago)
 Oriente (in Ñuñoa Commune of Greater Santiago)
 Lo Contador ( in Providencia Commune of Greater Santiago)

These four campuses have a total of 223,326.06 m2 constructed in a 614,569.92 m2 area. The Villarrica campus has 1,664 m2 constructed in a 2,362.5 m2 area.

History
UC Chile was founded on June 21, 1888, by the Santiago Archbishop, to offer training in traditional professions (law) and in technological and practical fields such as business, accounting, chemistry, and electricity. Its first chancellor was Monsignor Joaquín Larraín Gandarillas, and at the very beginning, the university only taught two subjects, law and mathematics. Since it is a Pontifical University, it has always had a strong and very close relationship with the Vatican. On February 11, 1930, Pope Pius XI declared it a pontifical university, and in 1931 it was granted full academic autonomy by the Chilean government.

UC Chile is a private, urban, multi-campus university. It is one of the eleven Chilean Catholic universities, and one of the twenty-five institutions within the Rectors' Council (Consejo de Rectores), the Chilean state-sponsored university system. It is part of the Universities of the Rectors' Council of Chilean Universities, and although it is not state-owned, a substantial part of its budget is given by state transfers under different programs.

UC Chile's 18 faculties are distributed through four campuses in Santiago and one regional campus located in southern Chile. The technical training centers affiliated with the university are: Duoc UC, the Rural Life Foundations, the Baviera Foundation, the Catechetical Home and the San Fidel Seminary. These centers carry out technical-academic extension activities in rural and agricultural areas. Other UC activities are a Sports Club, and a Clinical Hospital dependent on the Faculty of Medicine.

UC Chile's Graduates of the School of Architecture (one of the most prominent in Latin America) have also made important contributions to the country with such work as the Central Building ("Casa Central") of UC, and the National Library.

Two of its most important alumni are the Jesuit Saint Alberto Hurtado and Eduardo Frei Montalva, a Chilean president. Both of them studied in the School of Laws. Sebastián Piñera, former Chilean president, graduated from the university's School of Economics.

In 2017 the university faced what has been called a "wave of suicide" among its students. During 2017 a total of four students have taken their lives up to October, the previous year two students committed suicide. Critics, including alumni, have written about the university's "lack of concern" for the suicide of students, an attitude they contrast to the university's staunch opposition to abortion. The student union of the university issued a communique expressing feelings of guilt over the issue and the need to take charge.

Collaborations
The Department of Industry and System Engineering is engaging Stanford Technology Venture Program of Stanford University on a collaboration on innovation and technology ventures.

In December 2011, the schools of engineering of PUC and the University of Notre Dame signed an agreement to establish a dual graduate degree in civil engineering and the geological sciences, which now extends to other departments in both schools.

In April 2013, UC Chile and the University of Notre Dame also signed a memorandum of understanding to strengthen scholarly engagement and expand their long-standing relationships. The agreement establishes an exchange program in which faculty, doctoral students and university representatives from each institution will visit, work, study and collaborate with the other institution.

World rankings

UC ranks among the first 10 Latin-American Universities according to the Shanghai ranking, UC appears top in two subject rankings: it ranks around 101–150 in Economics and Management and around 151–200 in Mathematics

Pontificia Universidad Católica de Chile has been ranked as the best university in Latin America by two of the world's most prestigious University rankings, the QS World University Rankings (in 2018, 2019, 2020, 2021, 2022 and 2023) and the Times Higher Education University Rankings (2019 and 2020).

Faculties, institutes, centers and subjects offered

 College UC
 Bachelor of Natural Sciences and Mathematics
 Bachelor of Social Science
 Bachelor of Arts and Humanities
 Faculty of Agronomy & Forest Engineering
 Agronomy
 Forest Engineering
 Faculty of Architecture, Design, and Urban Studies
 School of Architecture
 Architecture
 School of Design
 Design
 Institute of Urban and Territorial Studies
 Urban Planning
 Faculty of Arts
 School of Visual Art
 Visual Art
 School of Theater
 Acting
 Institute of Music
 Music
 Faculty of Biological Sciences
 Biology (with an academic major in "Natural Resources & Environment" or "Bioprocesses")
 Biochemistry
 Marine Biology
 Faculty of Economic and Administrative Sciences
 Commercial Engineering
 Economics Institute
 School of Administration
 Faculty of Social Sciences
 Institute of Sociology
 Sociology
 Anthropology
 School of Psychology
 Psychology
 School of Social Work
 Social Work
 Faculty of Communications
 School of Journalism
 Journalism
 Audiovisual Direction Program
 Advertising
 Institute of Media Studies
 Faculty of Law
 Law
 Faculty of Language and Literature
 English Language and Literature
 Hispanic American Linguistics and Literature
 Center for the Study of Chilean Literature (CELICH)
 Faculty of Education
 Early Childhood Education
 General Education
 High School Education
 Faculty of Engineering
 School of Engineering
 Dept. of Computer Science
 Dept. of Engineering and Construction Management
 Dept. of Structural and Geotechnical Engineering
 Dept. of Hydraulic and Environmental Engineering
 Dept. of Transportation and Logistics Engineering
 Dept. of Industrial and Systems Engineering
 Dept. of Mechanical and Metallurgical Engineering
 Dept. of Chemical and Bioprocess Engineering
 Dept. of Electrical Engineering
 Dept. of Mining Engineering
 School of Construction
 Construction
 Faculty of Philosophy
 Institute of Philosophy
 Philosophy
 Institute of Aesthetics
 Aesthetics
 Faculty of Physics
 Department of Astronomy and Astrophysics
 Astronomy
 Department of Physics
 Physics
 Faculty of History, Geography, and Political Science
 Institute of History
 History
 Institute of Geography
 Geography
 Institute of Political Science
 Political Science
 Faculty of Mathematics
 Mathematics
 Statistics
 Faculty of Medicine
 School of Medicine
 Medicine
Odontology
Phonoaudiology
Kinesiology
Nutrition and dietetics
 School of Nursing
 Nursing and Obstretics
 Faculty of Chemistry
 Chemistry
 Chemistry and Pharmacy
 Faculty of Theology
 Theology
 Institute for Biological and Medical Engineering
 Biomedical Engineering
 Institute for Mathematical and Computational Engineering
 Data Science Engineering

Notable institutes and centers
 Center of Studies of Social Undertakings
 Instituto Milenio para la Investigación en Depresión y Personalidad – MIDAP	
 Núcleo Milenio Research Center in Entrepreneurial Strategy Under Uncertainty

Notable alumni

Architecture
 Alejandro Aravena (2016 Pritzker Architecture Prize winner)
 Smiljan Radic 
 Emilio Duhart
 Fernando Castillo Velasco
 Juan Grimm, Landscape architect

Art and literature
 Egon Wolff (playwright) 
 Roberto Matta (Surrealist painter)
 Jorge Díaz (playwright) 
 Diamela Eltit (author)
 Paula Escobar (journalist and academic)
 Laila Havilio (sculptor)

Economy
 Miguel Kast (former governor of the Central Bank of Chile. Member of the Chicago Boys group) 
 José Piñera
 Joaquín Lavín
 Sebastián Edwards (professor, UCLA Anderson School of Management)
 Sebastián Piñera
 Felipe Larraín

Politics
 Past President of Chile Eduardo Frei Montalva
 Sebastián Piñera
 Adolfo Zaldívar
 Arturo Frei Bolívar
 Ena von Baer
 Fernando Castillo Velasco
 Hernán Larraín
 Fernando Flores
 Jaime Guzmán
 Joaquín Lavín
 Osvaldo Andrade
 Radomiro Tomic
 Tomás Jocelyn-Holt
 José Antonio Kast
 Giorgio Jackson

Religion
 Alberto Hurtado (Jesuit. Chile's second saint)
 Raúl Silva Henríquez (Archbishop of Santiago de Chile)
Both studied law at the university.

Science
 Francisco Claro Huneeus
 Héctor Croxatto Rezzio (member of the Pontifical Academy of Sciences)
 Joaquín Luco Valenzuela (first Chilean to specialize in neuroscience)
 Juan de Dios Vial Correa (former Pontifical Academy for Life president)
 Juan Carlos Castilla (marine life expert)
 Leopoldo Soto Norambuena  (former President of the Chilean Physics Society and Fellow of the Institute of Physics, UK)
 Nibaldo Inestrosa Cantin (neurobiologist)
Neva Milicic Müller (psychologist)
 Rafael Vicuña Errázuriz

Knowledge transfer, service and consultancy 

 DICTUC SA (a group of 40+ consultancies leading in engineering, management and innovation) 
 Salud Clinica UC 
 Hospital of the Pontificia Universidad Catolica de Chile
 Mega UC Health Centres (maternity)

References

External links

Official web prospectus 
Official website 

 
Catholic Church in South America
Pontifical universities
Universities in Chile
Nursing schools in Chile
Educational institutions established in 1888
Catholic universities and colleges in Chile
Catholic
1888 establishments in Chile